The Keillers Park murder is a famous Swedish criminal case. On 23 July 1997, the body of an unknown man was discovered in a park in the city of Gothenburg, in western Sweden. The man, who had been shot twice with a pistol, was identified two days later as Josef ben Meddour (aged 36), a homosexual and Algerian national, who had been living in Sweden for many years.

After many months of investigation, the police were able to apprehend the two murderers. They were named as Jon Nödtveidt (aged 22), the frontman of extreme metal band Dissection, and his friend Vlad (aged 20), an Iranian national settled in Sweden. The two men, who confessed to their crime, were eventually sentenced by a court of appeal to ten years of incarceration. Vlad was also a suspect in other murder and assault cases around that time.

Nödtveidt and Vlad, who were members of the satanic cult Temple of the Black Light, had on several occasions discussed performing human sacrifices before they murdered Meddour. Whether the motive was occult-related or not could not be clearly established, however, and the murder was described as a homophobic hate crime by the Swedish police.

Discovery of the body 
On 23 July 1997, at around 4.30 pm, a sixteen-year-old boy discovered the body of a man, lying face down, at the base of an old water tower in Keillers Park, in downtown Gothenburg. Called on site, the police determined that the man had been shot twice with a pistol. The first bullet hit him in the back and went right through the heart, while the second was fired to his head as he lay on the ground. A bag and a head cap were recovered beside the body.

No identification was found on the corpse, but a female police officer recognized the man as someone who was often seen in the area of Svingeln square and who, with his curled hair and sunglasses, looked like Swedish singer Magnus Uggla. In the neighbourhood, a shop attendant told the police that the actual name of the victim was Josef and that he was often in the company of a Finnish-looking man. Thanks to this testimony, the police were able to identify Josef ben Meddour, aged 36, an Algerian national. Settled in Sweden for about ten years, Meddour was gay, and the Finnish-looking man was his boyfriend.

First leads 
The police first suspected the victim's boyfriend. The head cap recovered near the body was his, he had no alibi, and the couple was known for their frequent arguments. After twelve days in custody, the boyfriend was nevertheless released, and he was later cleared of all suspicion.

The investigators then learned that on the evening of 22 July, Meddour had received the visit of militants of the GIA, an Algerian Islamic organisation. As Meddour himself was known for his opposition to the GIA, the police considered the possibility of a political assassination. Other people were interrogated, but leading to no breakthrough, and the investigators soon realised they were headed in the wrong direction.

Arrests 

On 15 December 1997, a 23-year-old woman entered a police station in Stockholm, the Swedish capital. She wanted to file a complaint against her boyfriend Vlad, whom she accused of beating her, and threatening to kill her. She also told the police officers present that Vlad had once confessed to her that he was, along with his friend Jon, the perpetrator of the Keillers Park murder.

The story that Vlad had told the young woman was as follows: he and Nödtveidt met Meddour in a street of Gothenburg, and invited him to follow them to Keillers Park. There, they first tried to immobilise him with an electroshock weapon (Taser), which somehow did not succeed. Meddour tried to run away, but Vlad shot him in the back with a pistol. While Meddour was lying on the ground, Vlad handed the gun to Nödtveidt, who shot a second bullet into his head.

The 23-year-old woman also told the police that she knew the whereabouts of the murder weapon. Alerted, police investigators in Gothenburg could only acknowledge that observations made on the crime scene matched the woman's account of the events. Vlad was arrested the same day at his home in Stockholm. He was found carrying a loaded 9 mm pistol. Nödtveidt was apprehended in Gothenburg on the morning of 18 December.

Confessions 
The two suspects at first denied any involvement in Meddour's death, but after he was remanded on probable cause, Nödtveidt eventually made a confession. His account started the night of 21 to 22 July 1997, which he spent drinking at various pubs and clubs in Gothenburg, along with Vlad and two other friends. In the early morning, the two other friends headed back home, while Nödtveidt and Vlad started roaming in the city centre. Next to a park locally known as a meeting place for gay men, they were accosted by a stranger, who at the sight of their clothes, asked them if they were Satanists, and told them he wanted to learn about this cult. At first, Nödtveidt and Vlad tried to push back the unknown man, but he insisted. This was how they came to know Meddour.

The two friends eventually invited Meddour to follow them to Nödtveidt's home. While on the way, Meddour's behaviour and speech made clear he was a homosexual, which made Nödtveidt and Vlad feel angry and offended. Once they reached Nödtveidt's home, Meddour appeared scared and refused to step in. Nödtveidt and Vlad then suggested continuing their discussion about Satanism at Keillers Park. The three men hit the streets again, but before they left, Nödtveidt entered his flat to pick up the pistol and the Taser. Once at Keillers Park, Vlad took the Taser from Nödtveidt, and tried unsuccessfully to immobilise Meddour. Meddour attempted to run away, but his escape was cut short when Vlad shot a first bullet in his back, followed by a second bullet in his head.

When faced with his contradictions, Vlad also confessed to the murder. His version of the events was very similar to Nödtveidt's, apart from one significant difference: according to him, Nödtveidt was the one who had held the gun, and who had pulled the trigger twice.

Background 
The investigation led the Gothenburg police into the world of black metal and Satanism.

Black metal 

Nödtveidt was the leader of a musical band, Dissection, that had earned some fame in the small world of early black metal, a subgenre of heavy metal characterised by the occultism and raw violence of its lyrics, and by the extreme behaviour and lifestyle of its followers. In the middle of the nineties, the brief history of black metal was already riddled with violent deaths.

In 1991, Per Ohlin, the Swedish singer of a Norwegian band called Mayhem, committed suicide by shooting himself in the head with a shotgun. His body was found by the band's leader, Øystein Aarseth, who instead of calling the police immediately, left to buy a disposable camera, and came back to take photographs of the corpse, which were eventually used for the bootleg live album Dawn of the Black Hearts (whose creator, Mauricio Montoya Botero, died in 2002 by suicide). Aarseth also picked up fragments of his friend's skull, which ended up on a display shelf at the Helvete record shop in Oslo.

The following year, Bård "Faust" Eithun, a co-worker of Aarseth, stabbed a homosexual man in a park in Lillehammer. The murderer later stated homophobia as the motive for his act. Aarseth himself was stabbed to death in 1993 by a Norwegian musician, Varg Vikernes, who was known for his solo project Burzum. Vikernes claims that the murder was in fact an act of self-defense, as Aarseth had allegedly planned to murder him. Vikernes – who was also accused of burning three churches – was sentenced in 1994 to 21 years in prison.

Satanism 

When the arrests were made on 15 and 18 December 1997, the police discovered satanic altars in the homes of the two suspects. A human skull was also found at Vlad's place, for which he was charged with possession of human parts. Nödtveidt and Vlad were members of a satanic organization called Misanthropic Luciferian Order (MLO), of which Vlad was one of the founders, and that, according to the police, never had more than a handful of followers.

During their investigations, the police interrogated former members of the MLO, who described the organisation and narrated the occult ceremonies they had attended. Rituals included meditation, invocations of demons, and animal sacrifices (specifically cats, which were bought through classified ads). During the weeks that preceded the murder of Josef ben Meddour, Vlad had been more and more extremist in his speech, and the idea of performing human sacrifices, followed by a mass suicide, was discussed at length. During a meeting at Nödtveidt's place, a list of possible victims was made. It included a former follower who had defected, band members from Dissection, and even Nödtveidt's girlfriend.

These plans led to the defection of some members of the MLO, who did not want to take part in any assassination, or who feared for their own lives. As a result, when the arrests were made, the number of active members was down to three: Nödtveidt, Vlad, and his girlfriend.

Trials 
During the trial, the motives of the murder were not made clear as to whether it was a satanic crime, one of the human sacrifices that the MLO members had talked about, or if it was rather a hate crime, motivated by the anger Nödtveidt and Vlad had felt when confronted with Meddour's personality. According to criminal inspector Lars Ohlin, who led the police investigation, Nötveidt stated during interrogation that the murder was a "sacrifice to Satan", but later retracted the statement. According to Ohlin, there is no denying that Nödtveidt and Vlad's acts were made on a background of Satanism, but homophobia was also a clear factor, and the Keillers Park murder was registered as a hate crime by the Swedish police. 

On 6 July 1998, Nödtveidt was sentenced by the Gothenburg district court to eight years in prison for accessory to murder and illegal possession of a firearm. Vlad was sentenced to ten years for murder, violence against his girlfriend, illegal possession of a firearm and possession of body parts. All three parties appealed the verdict.

The Court of Appeal for Western Sweden gave its verdict on 25 September 1998. Nödtveidt was this time sentenced to ten years in prison, the same as Vlad, whose sentence was confirmed.

Epilogue 
Nödtveidt and Vlad were released in 2004, after spending seven years in prison. Nödtveidt committed suicide in 2006. His body was found at his home, surrounded by a ring of candles, a ritual book by his side.

Josef ben Meddour's body was repatriated to Algeria. He was buried in the national capital, Algiers.

In books and films 

 Keillers Park, film by Susanna Edwards released in 2006. imdb.

Notes

References

Sources 
P3 dokumentär om mordet i Keillers Park

On 24 March 2013, the Swedish radio station P3 broadcast a documentary produced by Ida Lundqvist on the Keillers Park murder.

Satanistmordet i Keillers Park

An article written by criminal inspector Lars Ohlin, who led the investigation, originally published in the book Nordisk kriminalkrönika 1999. It was reproduced in issue #31/2012 of the magazine Veckans brott.

Black metal
Homophobia
Hate crimes
Crimes involving Satanism or the occult
1997 in LGBT history
Violence against gay men
Violence against LGBT people in Europe
1990s in Gothenburg
July 1997 events in Europe
1997 murders in Sweden
Violence against men in Europe